Wilfred John Phillips (27 August 1895 – 14 March 1976) was an English footballer who played in the Football League for Bristol Rovers, Millwall, Clapton Orient, Thames, West Ham United and Stoke.

Career
Phillips was born in Bradley, Staffordshire, and played non-league football with Bilston United before joining Football League side Stoke in 1919. He played 14 matches for the "Potters" scoring three goals which included a brace against Coventry City on Boxing day. However manager Arthur Shallcross was seemingly unimpressed by Phillips's performance during the 1919–20 season and he was released by the club. He went on to play for Ebbw Vale, Darlaston and made a return to Bilston United before he re-entered League football with Bristol Rovers in 1923. He had an impressive first season at Rovers scoring 23 goals in 42 games and in December 1925 he joined league rivals Millwall for £500. Phillips became a prolific forward for the "Lions" and his 27 goals in 1927–28 helped Millwall to claim the Third Division South title.

After scoring 62 goals in 119 matches for Millwall he joined the short lived Thames in June 1930, and then signed for West Ham United, for another £500 fee, in May 1931. He scored on his Irons debut, a 4–2 victory against Blackburn Rovers at Ewood Park. His single season at Upton Park saw relegation to the Second Division. He then joined Clapton Orient before returning to his native Midlands and played for Stourbridge.

Career statistics
Source:

Honours
 Football League Third Division South champion: 1927–28

References

1895 births
1973 deaths
Footballers from Staffordshire
Association football forwards
English footballers
Bilston Town F.C. players
Stoke City F.C. players
Ebbw Vale F.C. players
Darlaston Town F.C. players
Bristol Rovers F.C. players
Millwall F.C. players
Thames A.F.C. players
West Ham United F.C. players
Leyton Orient F.C. players
Stourbridge F.C. players
English Football League players